Gig Performer is a cross-platform audio plug-in host software package developed by Deskew Technologies. It is designed to provide a solution for playing an instrument and effect plug-ins live, without using a DAW. It was originally released in late 2016.

Gig Performer allows using virtual instrument plugins such as synths, samplers, guitar effect racks, EQ effects or compressors, and lets you switch from one set of plugins to another while playing.

Features 
Gig Performer manages collections of plug-ins in customizable organizational units called "rackspaces" consisting of one or more front panels. Plug-ins and other elements i.e. virtual instruments, effects, MIDI devices and or audio interfaces can be connected within rackspaces. Rackspaces can be further organized as parts of songs, where they can be reused with along with song specific overrides.

Some features include:

 Visual workflow, by routing audio from one plugin to another by connecting them together with wires
 Support for VST, VST3 and AU plugins.
 Built-in audio and MIDI recorder
 An OSC implementation for remote control as well as OSC/MIDI conversion.
 Proprietary scripting language which allows advanced customization

Notes

References 

Proprietary cross-platform software
Audio software
2016 software